Birmingham Community Charter High School (formerly Birmingham High School) is a charter coeducational high school in the neighborhood/district of Lake Balboa in the San Fernando Valley section of Los Angeles, California, United States. It was founded in 1953 as a 7–12 grade combined high school and became solely a senior high school in 1963. The school has a Van Nuys address and serves Lake Balboa, parts of Encino, and Amestoy Estates. It is within the Los Angeles Unified School District but operates as an internal charter school.

History
The land of Birmingham High School was a US Army hospital called Birmingham General Hospital from August 24, 1943, until March 31, 1946. From 1946 to 1950 the hospital was named the Birmingham Veterans Administration Hospital when it was turned over to the Veterans Administration. In 1952, the hospital was sold to the Los Angeles City Schools for $1.00. The hospital was named after Brigadier General Henry Patrick Birmingham (1854–1932), with the World War I US Army Medical Corps.
The school opened in 1953, during the immediate post-World War II era. Originally it served children grades seven to 12 from families newly settled in the San Fernando Valley. As of the 1960s the families were middle-class, and many of them had settled in the San Fernando Valley from the East Coast and the Midwest.

It was in the Los Angeles City High School District until 1961, when it merged into LAUSD.

On November 13, 1992, a 17-year old student was stabbed twice in the back from a gang-related fight. He was immediately treated and sent to Northridge Hospital Medical Center for non-life threatening wounds.

By 2006, the student demographics became majority Latino and Hispanic. The same year, Marsha Coates, the principal, established "small learning communities" and a ninth-grade academy in order to cater to incoming students.

Charter designation
On July 1, 2009, the Los Angeles Unified School District (LAUSD) voted to allow the high school to become a charter school under the name Birmingham Community Charter High School. Prior to the approval, the school officials had fought over whether the school should become a charter for months. Some school officials had advocated creating an alternate school sponsored by the teacher's union on the same campus. About 66% of the faculty members of the school supported the charter change. After the charter was approved, 91 teachers continued to teach at Birmingham while 34 decided to leave to work at other LAUSD schools. This meant the Spanish, science, and history departments had a high level of turnover.

Because of the divisions within teachers and other staff members, the faculty and staff of the magnet program received permission from LAUSD to split from Birmingham. In 2009, Daniel Pearl Magnet High School was formed as an independent high school within the Birmingham campus. Connie Llanos of the Los Angeles Daily News said that Pearl "got off to a rocky start." During the first year as a standalone school, one third of the students left. Some left due to conflicts with Birmingham staff and students; some Birmingham students and staff members tormented Pearl students. Some left because Pearl was so small; they wanted a more comprehensive high school experience. Pearl moved into its own facility next to Birmingham in 2010.

In 2012 LAUSD officials accused the school of failing to adequately respond to allegations of racial discrimination and mishandling disabled student services and expulsion, and the LAUSD officials attempted to return Birmingham to direct district control. Birmingham officials stated that they were unaware of serious problems at their school.

Campus
The school is located in the Lake Balboa area, which was previously a part of Van Nuys. The site was previously a military hospital.

As of 2009, Birmingham has the largest high school campus in the LAUSD, at 53 acres. The campus is in proximity to Reseda.

Attendance boundary
Its attendance boundary includes Lake Balboa, and portions of Van Nuys, Encino, Tarzana, and Reseda.

Academics
In 2006 Mitchell Landsberg of the Los Angeles Times wrote that "It would be easy to see Birmingham as just another bad public school. But for many students, it's not." He cited the Daniel Pearl Journalism Magnet, the "dedicated core of teachers" and the "variety of honors and Advanced Placement classes." Landsberg stated that despite the demographic changes that came before 2006, "academic standards have not suffered; if anything, a Birmingham diploma today is more difficult to obtain than it was a generation ago."

Demographics
In 2009 the school had 2,700 students. That year, Mitchell Landsberg of the Los Angeles Times wrote that "Birmingham is in some ways the quintessential Los Angeles school, with demographics and student performance that come close to mirroring the city as a whole."

In September 2001 there were 1,100 9th graders entering Birmingham High School; this class would become the Class of 2005. Over 350 of the students in this class, over the course of the years, switched to other schools to study. About half of the switching students remained at traditional high schools and the other half went to independent study, vocational school, or other alternative educational settings. In June 2005 there were 521 graduating students of the Class of 2005, fewer than half of the starting number. Media attention to this rate of graduation resulted in a nighttime meeting with parents.

In a period prior to 2006 students zoned to overcrowded high schools were bused to Birmingham. 102 students who were zoned to Belmont High School were instead a part of the Birmingham Class of 2005.

As of 2006 there were almost 4,000 students attending the school. Landsberg wrote that there had been ethnic conflicts between Latino and African-American students and between Latino and Armenian students the same year.

From 2016 to 2017, about 3,145 students enrolled at Birmingham High School, making it a large school. Birmingham is ranked one of the top 10 largest schools in California. The school offers their students college course classes known as AP courses to prepare students for college. These courses include: Art History, Calculus AB, Calculus BC, Chemistry, Environmental Science, Human Geography, Psychology, United States Government and Politics, English Language and Composition, European History, Human Geography, Spanish Literature and Culture, Statistics, Studio Art: 2-D Design, Studio Art: Drawing, and United States History.

Academic performance
In 2006 Mitchell Landsberg of the Los Angeles Times wrote that "Many students thrived at Birmingham", but "many others struggled, or gave up and quit." As of that year, he stated that the school "sent its share of students to good colleges -- Cal State and UC campuses, even the Ivy League." In the Class of 2005, about 75% had intentions to partake in higher education. Over 60 students from that class went to the University of California campuses.

In 2006 the LAUSD gave the official four-year graduation rate of Birmingham High as being almost 80%, with an official dropout rate of 3.5%. A Civil Rights Project at Harvard University/University of California, Los Angeles published a report in the northern hemisphere Spring of 2005 that stated that the four year graduation rate at Birmingham was 50%.

In 2009, 9% of students were rated as proficient or higher in mathematics and 34% were rated as proficient or higher in English. In 2008 9% received this rating in mathematics and 36% received this rating in English.

Student discipline
In 2006, principal Marsha Coates stated, "We have 20, 30 kids or so who are constantly out of class. They're on campus, they're not dropouts and they haven't disappeared. They just roam." Despite the school giving out tickets to truants and a new attendance system implemented on November 6, 2005, as of 2006 there were still truant students walking in the halls of the school.

In popular culture 
Birmingham High School has been used as the backdrop for numerous music videos, commercials, and television shows, such as the music video for  Simple Plan's song "Can't Keep My Hands off You", Missy Elliott's song "Gossip Folks", Gwen Stefani's song "Hollaback Girl", Corbin Bleu's song "Push It to the Limit," Eminem's "No Love", Lil Wayne's "Prom Queen", and Charli XCX's "Break the Rules". In 2007 an episode of America's Next Top Model was filmed there, also two more episodes were filmed there, one in 2008, and later in 2013. Other shows filmed at Birmingham High School include Nip/Tuck, NCIS, Cold Case, Scrubs, The Office, Ghost Whisperer and Monk.

The school's football field was used as a set for the shoot of the music video for Angels & Airwaves' song "Everything's Magic". The track surrounding the football field served as the location for the relay race scene starring Kirk Cameron in Like Father Like Son. An episode of Full House was filmed there, with Danny, Jessy, and Joey running a race around the track. In addition, Fanny Pak of America's Best Dance Crew comes to the dance studio to practice before they go on tour.

In June 2009 Los Angeles Schools superintendent Ramon C. Cortines objected to photographs of the school's football team posing with comedian Sacha Baron Cohen in his guise as Brüno that appeared in GQ magazine.<ref>"LA schools chief fumes over 'Bruno' school photos. (June 30, 2009) Associated Press. Retrieved on August 31, 2011.</ref> Although Cortines gave discipline against principal Marcia Coates and athletic director Rick Prizant, Cortines stated that the discipline could not be enforced, because, since Birmingham was becoming a charter school, Coates and Prizant would no longer be LAUSD employees.

Miranda Cosgrove's music video for "Dancing Crazy" was filmed on the football field. The hit show on MTV, Awkward, has also been filmed at Birmingham.

 Sports 
The school's athletic nickname is the Patriots. Originally the nickname was the Braves. Native Americans in the San Fernando Valley had campaigned against the use of the "Braves" mascot at Birmingham High, as part of a national movement to remove Native American mascots. They met with the Los Angeles School Board because, according to Paul Kivel, author of Uprooting Racism: How White People Can Work for Racial Justice Ð 3rd Edition, they "met with so much intransigence at the high school". The LAUSD school board voted to remove Native American mascots and logos from all schools.

The school was told that it needed to change its mascot by June 28, 1998. The students voted for the new mascot to be the "Blue Devil". Gerald Kleinman, the principal at the time, stated that the school's mascot committee believed the "Blue Devil" was an inappropriate choice and overruled the students, instead choosing the "Patriot".

In soccer, Michael Erush was honored as the 1999 Los Angeles Times and Los Angeles Daily News All-Region Player of the Year, and was a 2000 NSCAA High School All-America selection. He was three-time All-Northwest Conference, and two-time All-Valley and All-West Valley League, as well as All-America honorable mention as a senior. He was inducted into the Birmingham Community Charter Athletic Hall of Fame.

Under coach Ed Croson, the football team won CIF Southern Section championships in 2005, 2007, and 2008, with contributions from future NFL players Malik Jackson, Mychal Rivera, and Donovan Carter, as well as standouts such as Milton Knox, Marquis Jackson (Malik's twin brother), and TJ Rosas.

From 2003 to 2007, the basketball coach was Andre McCarter, MVP for the Rochester, New York Zeniths of the Continental Basketball Association in the 1978–79 season. McCarter played on UCLA's national championship teams in the early 1970s under John Wooden.

In 2006, the Birmingham boys' soccer team won their first L.A. city section championship by upsetting the Canoga Park Hunters with a final score of 4–2. The team was coached by coach E.B Madha and led by seniors Eric Moran, Rene Alveranga, Juan Davila and scoring team leader Oscar Garcia. Birmingham has added more championships and is currently one of the premier high school soccer programs in the San Fernando Valley.

In the 2008–09 school year, Birmingham introduced a lacrosse team. In May 2015, the boys' and girls' lacrosse teams were the only teams to win a California Interscholastic Federation (CIF) city championship that year. The Patriots were also victorious over Palisades with a score of 11–1 for the girls and with a score of 9-4 for the boys, which was the second consecutive City championship for the girls' team.

In 2013, the Birmingham wrestling team won their first L.A. City Section Championship in school history.

In 2010 the Birmingham cross country team went on to win both the boys' and girls' L.A. City Section Championship, adding to head coach Scott King's 16 city championships in his time at Birmingham.

The track surrounding the football field was home to the CIF Los Angeles City Section Championships until 2014.

From 2017 to 2019, Birmingham Varsity baseball won back to back to back L.A. City section open division championships which was led by coaches Matt Mowry, Gus Rico, Paul Blair, and Alex Gamez.

 Notable alumni 

 Larry Bell – artist
 Lisa Bonet – actress
 Damon Buford – Major League Baseball player
 Mick Burrs – poet
 Marc Cohen – ABC radio talk show host
 Tim Conway Jr. – radio personality, The Tim Conway Jr. Show Ronnie Eckstine – actor
Michael Erush (born 1984) - soccer player and coach
 Jordan Farmar (born 1986) – basketball player (transferred to and graduated from William Howard Taft High School in Woodland Hills)
 Raymond E. Feist – novelist
 Sally Field – actress; played Gidget in 1965
 Mossimo Giannulli – clothing designer, founder of Mossimo (graduated from HS in Orange County)
 Terry Gilliam – director, actor, Monty Python
Jay Golden – academic, sustainability leader
 David Gregory – journalist
 Bill Handel – radio personality, KFI 640 AM
 Jermaine Jackson (1973) – singer, songwriter
 Malik Jackson – NFL player
 Marquis Jackson – NFL player
 Jeremy Licht – actor
 Linda Lingle – governor of Hawaii
 Michael Milken – financier, philanthropist
 Mahbod Moghadam, co-founder of Rapgenius and CEO of Everipedia
 Tamera Mowry – actress
 Tia Mowry – actress
 Robert Newman – actor, Guiding Light Michael Ovitz – talent agent
 Daniel Pearl – journalist
 Ken Poulsen – baseball player, member of "Impossible Dream" 1967 Boston Red Sox American League championship team
 Michael Richards – actor (graduated from high school in Ventura County)
 Sally Ride – physicist and former NASA astronaut (graduated from Westlake School for Girls)
 Mychal Rivera – NFL player
 Paul Rodriguez Jr. – professional skateboarder
 Daniel Rotman - entrepreneur
 David S. Rubin – curator, art critic, artist
 Bobby Sherman – actor
 Hasan Zaidi – Harvard Brain Surgeon, 
 Mickey Sholdar – actor
 Judee Sill – singer, actor
 Pamela Skaist-Levy – clothing designer, founder of Juicy Couture
 Leland Sklar - bassist
 Chris Taylor – Wisconsin State Assembly member and Wisconsin Circuit Court Judge
 Karrueche Tran – model and actress
 Karen Valentine – actress, Room 222''
 Barry Van Dyke – actor
 Billy Warlock – actor
 Cindy Williams – actress
 Jeron Wilson – professional skateboarder

Notable faculty

Hy Cohen (1931–2021) – Major League Baseball player

See also

References

Further reading
 "Birmingham Community Charter High School Renewal Charter Petition Submitted to the Los Angeles Unified School District October 29, 2013 For the term July 1, 2014 – June 30, 2019." (Archive) Los Angeles Unified School District.

External links
 

High schools in the San Fernando Valley
High schools in Los Angeles County, California
Lake Balboa, Los Angeles
Van Nuys, Los Angeles
Charter high schools in California
Los Angeles Unified School District schools
Educational institutions established in 1953
1953 establishments in California